Willaston is a large village situated on the Wirral Peninsula, Cheshire, England. Centred on a village green, it is located in the unitary authority of Cheshire West and Chester between Neston and Ellesmere Port, less than a mile south of the  Metropolitan Borough of Wirral boundary. It is located very closely to Eastham and Bromborough and just a short distance away from Neston. At the 2001 Census, the total population of Willaston and Thornton ward was 4,913.

History
Willaston (or Wilaveston) was the earlier name of the Wirral Hundred (Hundred of Wilaveston), the peninsula's former administrative division, and one of the Hundreds of Cheshire.
The Hundredal name is often taken from the administrative area for the Hundred, suggesting Willaston was once of some importance in the post-Roman period as the meeting place of the hundred court.

Later the village became a township within the parish of Neston, the largest settlement on the Wirral until the early 19th century. Willaston included part of the hamlet of Badgers Rake, which became part of the civil parish of Ledsham in 1933. The population of Willaston was recorded at 196 in 1801, 317 in 1851, 597 in 1901 and 1,458 in 1951.

The half timbered building, the 'Red Lion' was an inn built in 1631, although possibly a significant enlargement of an earlier construction. Located opposite the village green, it remained a public house until 1928 and was eventually renovated as a private residence.

Willaston Windmill, built in 1800, was the largest windmill in Wirral. During the early 20th century it was used for the production of flour and to grind cattle food. It remained working until about 1930, when its sails were destroyed in a storm. The windmill has also since been converted into a private dwelling.

Community
Hadlow Road railway station, which served the village until its closure in 1955, became part of Wirral Country Park in 1973. The station building, signal box and eastbound platform have been renovated to their former 1950's condition. The former trackbed has become a public pathway, known as the 'Wirral Way'.

The local school, Willaston Church of England Primary School, is the only educational establishment in the village, though there are several playgroups in the area. 

Although there are no secondary schools in the area, Wirral Grammar School for Girls and Wirral Grammar School for Boys are situated nearby, as well as Neston High School and South Wirral High School - both a short car journey from the village. 
Willaston's local football club plays in the West Cheshire Amateur Football League Division 2.

The village has its own Festival Society, which launched its most successful festival in July 2009. The festival involves fancy dress, a parade and various stalls selling food and games.

Transport 
Willaston has regular bus routes. 
 22 to Chester and West Kirby, hourly. Company: Stagecoach
272 to Neston and Ellesmere Port (via Hooton station), hourly. Company: Aintree Coachline
 359 to Neston High School, one morning Journey. Company: Helms Coaches
 65A to Wirral Grammar School for Girls and Wirral Grammar School for Boys, one morning journey and one afternoon journey. Company: Helms of Eastham

The nearest railway station is Hooton, which is approximately 20 minutes walking distance of the village. The station, part of the Merseyrail network, has trains every 5 to 8 minutes to Liverpool, 15 minutes to Chester and 30 minutes to Ellesmere Port, weekdays and Saturdays. In the evenings trains to Chester and Ellesmere Port run every 30 minutes and to Liverpool every 15 minutes. On Sundays a different timetable operates.

See also

Listed buildings in Willaston, Cheshire West
Willaston Old Hall
Christ Church, Willaston

References

External links

 
Villages in Cheshire
Former civil parishes in Cheshire
Unparished areas in Cheshire
Cheshire West and Chester